A structural basin is a large-scale structural formation of rock strata formed by tectonic warping of previously flat-lying strata. They are geological depressions, the inverse of domes. Elongated structural basins are also known as synclines. Some are sedimentary basins, aggregations of sediment that filled up a depression or accumulated in an area. Others were formed by tectonic events long after the sedimentary layers were deposited.

Basins may appear on a geologic map as roughly circular or elliptical, with concentric layers. Because the strata dip toward the center, the exposed strata in a basin are progressively younger from the outside in, with the youngest rocks in the center. Basins are often large in areal extent, often hundreds of kilometers across.

Structural basins are often important sources of coal, petroleum, and groundwater.

Examples

Europe
 Hampshire Basin, United Kingdom
 London Basin, United Kingdom
 Paris Basin, France
 Permian Basin, Poland, northern Germany, Denmark, the Netherlands, the North Sea, and Scotland
 Turgay Basin, Kazakhstan

North America

Trinidad and Tobago  
 Southern Basin, Trinidad

United States 
 Albuquerque Basin, New Mexico
 Appalachian Basin, Eastern United States
 Big Horn Basin, Wyoming
 Black Warrior Basin, Alabama and Mississippi
 Delaware Basin, Texas and New Mexico
 Denver Basin, Colorado
 Illinois Basin, Illinois
 Los Angeles Basin, California
 Michigan Basin, Michigan
 North Park Colorado Basin
 Paradox Basin, Utah and Colorado
 Permian Basin, Texas and New Mexico
 Piceance Basin, Colorado
 Powder River Basin, Wyoming and Montana
 Raton Basin, Colorado and New Mexico
 Sacramento Basin, California
 San Juan Basin, New Mexico and Colorado
 Uinta Basin, Utah
 Williston Basin, Montana and North Dakota
 Wind River Basin, Wyoming

Oceania

Australia
 Amadeus Basin
 Bowen Basin
 Cooper Basin
 Galilee Basin
 Great Artesian Basin

South America
Chaco Basin, Argentina, Bolivia and Paraguay 
Magallanes Basin, Chile
Neuquén Basin, Argentina and Chile
Paraná Basin, Argentina, Brazil, Paraguay and Uruguay
Llanos Basin, Colombia

See also 

 Drainage basin
 Fold belt

References 
 Monroe, James S., and Reed Wicander. The Changing Earth: Exploring Geology and Evolution. 2nd ed. Belmont: Wadsworth Publishing Company, 1997. 

  
Depressions (geology)
Structural geology